Vladimir Nikolayevich Morozov (born 12 December 1977) is a former Russian professional football player.

Club career
He played two seasons in the Russian Football National League for FC Neftekhimik Nizhnekamsk.

References

External links
 

1977 births
Living people
Russian footballers
Association football forwards
FC Ural Yekaterinburg players
FC Neftekhimik Nizhnekamsk players